The Uncertainty Principle is a 2002 Portuguese drama film directed by Manoel de Oliveira. It was entered into the 2002 Cannes Film Festival.

Cast
 Leonor Baldaque - Camila
 Leonor Silveira - Vanessa
 Isabel Ruth - Celsa
 Ricardo Trêpa - Jose Feliciano
 Ivo Canelas - Antonio Clara
 Luís Miguel Cintra - Daniel Roper
 José Manuel Mendes - Torcato Roper
 Carmen Santos - Joana
 Cecília Guimarães - Rute
 Júlia Buisel - Aunt Tofi
 Ângela Marques - Adoração
 Diogo Dória - Policeman
 Antonio Fonseca - Policeman
 Duarte de Almeida - Mr. Ferreira
 P. João Marques - Priest
 António Costa - Tiago
 David Cardoso - Overman

References

External links
 

2002 films
2000s Portuguese-language films
2002 drama films
Films based on works by Agustina Bessa-Luís
Films directed by Manoel de Oliveira
Films produced by Paulo Branco
Portuguese drama films